Russula silvicola is a species of agaric fungus in the family Russulaceae. Found in North America, it was described as new to science in 1975. It is considered inedible.  It has a strong peppery flavor.

See also
List of Russula species

References

External links

silvicola
Fungi described in 1975
Fungi of North America
Inedible fungi